= Shramik Sangram Committee =

Shramik Sangram Committee (Workers Struggle Committee) is a leftwing organisation in West Bengal, India. SSC publishes Shramik Istehar.
